Coelopyrena is a monotypic genus of flowering plants in the family Rubiaceae. The genus contains only one species, viz. Coelopyrena salicifolia, which is endemic to the Maluku Islands.

References

External links
Coelopyrena in the World Checklist of Rubiaceae

Monotypic Rubiaceae genera
Morindeae